Tănase Mureșanu (22 May 1940 – 6 March 2007) is a Romanian foil fencer.

Career
Mureșanu took up fencing when he was 11 years old under coach Angelo Pellegrini at CS Progresul in Bucharest. He won the junior national championship in 1956 and 1957, then the senior championship in 1957, 1958 and 1963. He took a bronze medal in the 1958 Junior World Criterium in Bucharest and in the 1959 edition in Paris, both in foil and sabre.

In 1964 he transferred to CSA Steaua with coach Vasile Chelaru. Along with Iuliu Falb, Ion Drîmbă, Ștefan Ardeleanu and Mihai Țiu, he earned Romania's first team world title in fencing at the 1967 World Championships in Montreal. He competed at four Olympic Games from 1960 to 1972. For his accomplishments he was named "honoured master of sports" (maestru emerit al sportului) in 1968.

In parallel to his career as an athlete Mureșanu became a fencing coach at CS Viitorul. He was a federal coach for the Romanian Fencing Federation from 1974 to 2000 and served as international referee for the International Fencing Federation. He moved to Switzerland to pursue his coaching career. He died there on 6 March 2007.

References

External links
 

1940 births
2007 deaths
Romanian male foil fencers
Olympic fencers of Romania
Fencers at the 1960 Summer Olympics
Fencers at the 1964 Summer Olympics
Fencers at the 1968 Summer Olympics
Fencers at the 1972 Summer Olympics
Sportspeople from Bucharest